A truss is a tight bundle of hay or straw.  It would usually be cuboid, for storage or shipping, and would either be harvested into such bundles or cut from a large rick.

Markets and law

Hay and straw were important commodities in the pre-industrial era.  Hay was required as fodder for animals, especially horses, and straw was used for a variety of purposes including bedding.  In London, there were established markets for hay at Smithfield, Whitechapel and by the village of Charing, which is still now called the Haymarket.  The weight of trusses was regulated by law and statutes were passed in the reigns of William III and Mary II, George II and George III.  The latter act of 1796 established the weights as follows:In summary then, the standard weights of a truss were:

 new hay, 60 pounds
 old hay, 56 pounds
 straw, 36 pounds

and 36 trusses made up a load.

Trussing
  

    
A detailed description was provided in British Husbandry, sponsored by the Society for the Diffusion of Useful Knowledge,

Carriage

The London hay-cart may have been purpose-made to carry a load of 36 trusses.  John French Burke wrote in 1834,

Consumption
British army regulations in 1799 specified standard rations of trusses. These were one truss of straw for each two soldiers, to stuff their palliasses.  Half a truss was provided after sixteen days to refresh this and the whole was then changed after 32 days.  Five trusses of straw were provided for each company every sixteen days for the batmen and washerwomen, who did not have palliasses.  Thirty trusses of straw were provided per company when they took the field to thatch the huts of the washerwomen.

References

Customary units of measurement
Units of mass